William Forrest "Wild Bill" Hutchinson (December 17, 1859 – March 19, 1926) was an American professional baseball player.  He was a right-handed pitcher over parts of nine seasons (1884, 1889–1897) with the Kansas City Cowboys, Chicago White Stockings/Colts and St. Louis Browns.  He was the National League wins leader for three straight seasons (1890–1892) and strikeout champion in 1892 with Chicago. For his career, he compiled a 182–163 record in 376 appearances, with a 3.59 earned run average and 1,235 strikeouts. He is the most recent player in baseball history to pitch 500 or 600 innings in a single season, a feat which he last accomplished in 1892.

During his seven seasons with the Chicago franchise (now the Chicago Cubs) he ranks 4th all-time in franchise history in wins (181), 6th in games pitched (367), 2nd in innings pitched (3021), 6th in strikeouts (1224), 3rd in games started (339), 1st in complete games (317), 10th in shutouts (21), 1st in base on balls allowed (1109), 1st in losses (158), and 1st in wild pitches (120).

He was born in New Haven, Connecticut, attended Yale University, and later died in Kansas City, Missouri at the age of 66.

See also

 List of Major League Baseball annual saves leaders
 List of Major League Baseball annual strikeout leaders
 List of Major League Baseball annual wins leaders

References

External links

1859 births
1926 deaths
Major League Baseball pitchers
Baseball players from New Haven, Connecticut
Kansas City Cowboys (UA) players
Chicago White Stockings players
Chicago Colts players
St. Louis Browns (NL) players
National League strikeout champions
National League wins champions
19th-century baseball players
Springfield, Illinois (minor league baseball) players
Des Moines Hawkeyes players
Des Moines Prohibitionists players
Minneapolis Millers (baseball) players
Yale University alumni